The Hong Kong Court of Final Appeal (HKCFA or CFA) is the final appellate court of Hong Kong. It was established on 1 July 1997, upon the establishment of the Hong Kong Special Administrative Region, replacing the Judicial Committee of the Privy Council as the highest judicial institution under Hong Kong law. As defined in Articles 19 and 85 of the Basic Law of Hong Kong, the Court of Final Appeal "exercises judicial power in the Region independently and free from any interference." The Hong Kong Court of Final Appeal Ordinance and the Hong Kong Court of Final Appeal Rules set out the detailed functions and procedures of the court.

The court meets in the Court of Final Appeal Building located in Central, Hong Kong.

Role of the court 
From the 1840s to 30 June 1997, Hong Kong was a British Dependent Territory, and the power of final adjudication on the laws of Hong Kong was vested in the Judicial Committee of the Privy Council in London. The power to exercise sovereignty over Hong Kong was transferred from the United Kingdom to the People's Republic of China on 1 July 1997. Based on the one country, two systems principle, Hong Kong retains a high degree of autonomy and maintains its own legal system. The Court of Final Appeal was established on 1 July 1997 in Central, Hong Kong. Since then, it has served as the court of last resort; the court has the power of final adjudication with respect to the law of Hong Kong as well as the power of final interpretation over local laws including the power to strike down local ordinances on the grounds of inconsistency with the Basic Law. However, this power is not absolute; the court's decisions can be overturned by the Chinese government via a controversial process known as an "interpretation" via Article 158 of the Basic Law.

Court structure 
The Court of Final Appeal is made up of the Chief Justice, at least three Permanent Judges, and at most 30 Non-Permanent Judges who can come from Hong Kong or any overseas Common Law jurisdictions. Under the Basic Law, the constitutional document of Hong Kong, the special administrative region remains a common law jurisdiction. Judges from other common law jurisdictions can be recruited and serve in the judiciary as non-permanent judges according to Article 92 of the Basic Law; to date, Judges appointed have served in the judiciaries of England and Wales, Australia, New Zealand, and Canada. Aside from the Chief Justice, there is no nationality requirement for any of the permanent or non-permanent judges.

Since 2009, under the auspices of the former Chief Justice Geoffrey Ma, judicial assistants have been appointed  to provide support and assistance to its judges.

The Court of Final Appeal has no original jurisdiction; an appeal has to originate from the High Court (either from the Court of Appeal or the Court of First Instance).

Allowing an appeal 
Whether an appeal is allowed or not is determined by a panel of three Hong Kong judges, usually the Chief Justice and two other permanent judges. Should the Chief Justice or a permanent judge not be available, the other permanent judge or a non-permanent judge from Hong Kong may be called in. Non-permanent judges from other jurisdictions do not sit on such panels.

There is also a Registrar attached to the Court of Final Appeal, to help with review of appeal applications and other administrative duties.

Hearing an appeal 
All appeal cases are heard by a bench of five judges consisting of the Chief Justice, three permanent judges and a non-permanent judge from another common law jurisdiction. If the Chief Justice does not sit in an appeal, a permanent judge is designated to sit in the Chief Justice's place, and a non-permanent judge from Hong Kong will sit on the court as well. Similarly, if a permanent judge is unable to sit, a non-permanent Hong Kong judge will sit in place of that permanent judge. Technically, should a non-permanent judge from outside Hong Kong be unable to attend due to extraordinary circumstances (such as during the COVID-19 pandemic), two non-permanent Hong Kong judges may sit on the court or sit via video conferencing.

As the role of a non-permanent judge is not a full time role, a serving High Court judge may be appointed as a non-permanent judge concurrently, such as Vice-president Robert Tang and Vice-president Frank Stock, as they were then known. This is extended only to the most eminent and senior serving High Court justices.

Building 
From its inception in July 1997 until September 2015, the court was located in the Former French Mission Building, in Central. In September 2015, the court relocated to the former (until 2011) Legislative Council Building, which was originally the colonial Supreme Court (1912–1985).

List of buildings used 
 Former French Mission Building (1 July 1997 – 6 September 2015)
 Court of Final Appeal Building (since 7 September 2015)

Gallery

Current court

The Cheung Court 
The Cheung Court began on 11 January 2021 ( ago), when Andrew Cheung began his tenure as the 3rd Chief Justice. Currently, 18 justices serve on the Cheung Court, including the Chief Justice, 3 Permanent Judges, and 14 non-permanent judges (10 of which are from other common law jurisdictions). 
The Hon. Chief Justice Andrew Cheung (since January 2021; first appointed Permanent Judge in October 2018)
 The Hon. Mr. Justice Roberto Ribeiro (since September 2000)
 The Hon. Mr. Justice Joseph Fok (since October 2013)
The Hon. Mr. Justice Johnson Lam (since July 2021)

List of permanent judges

Chief Justices

Permanent Judges

List of non-permanent judges

Current non-permanent judges from Hong Kong

Current non-permanent judges from other common law jurisdictions 

The following appointments have been made by the Chief Executive, based on the recommendation of the Judicial Officers Recommendation Commission (JORC), and are either pending approval from the Legislative Council (LegCo) or awaiting effective date:

 Patrick Keane as Non-Permanent Judge; awaiting effective date

Former non-permanent judges from Hong Kong

Former non-permanent judges from other common law jurisdictions

Controversies 
While the CFA is the final appellate court in Hong Kong, and is granted power of final adjudication, the fact that the Central Government of China has the power to interpret - in essence overturn - the CFA's rulings has caused great controversy over the years. This has led the CFA to be mockingly referred to as the "Court of Semi-Final Appeal" by people such as former Hong Kong Bar Association Chairman Martin Lee KC SC, veteran activist-investor David Webb, human rights lawyer Mark Daly, as well as everyday citizens. The term "Court of Semi-Final Appeal" has been officially referenced to by then-Secretary for Justice Elsie Leung as far back as 1999. A more detailed list of controversies around the CFA are listed below.

Article 158 interpretation 
The controversial power of final interpretation of "national" law including the Basic Law is vested in the Standing Committee of the National People's Congress of China (NPCSC) by virtue of Article 158 of the Basic Law and by the Constitution of the PRC; however, "national" laws which are not explicitly listed in Annex III of the Basic Law are not operative in Hong Kong.

Article 158 delegates such power to the courts of Hong Kong for interpretation while handling court cases. Although this arrangement has attracted criticism of "undermining judicial independence", an interpretation by the NPCSC does not affect any court judgments already rendered. This practice is highly controversial as it contradicts the power of final adjudication; the first time an interpretation occurred in 1999, all five judges (including the Chief Justice, all three permanent justices and one non-permanent justice) involved in the case of Ng Ka Ling v Director of Immigration reportedly considered quitting the top court in protest.

Instances of Article 158 interpretations are as follows:

 1999: Right of abode in Hong Kong
 2004: Modifying the process of electoral reforms regarding the election of the Hong Kong Chief Executive (Basic Law Article 45 and 2005 Hong Kong Chief Executive election)
 2005: Dealing with an incomplete term of a Chief Executive
 2011: State immunity and the jurisdiction of Hong Kong courts
 2016: Legislative Council oath-taking controversy
 2022: Participation of overseas solicitors and barristers in national security law cases (Jimmy Lai's hiring of Tim Owen KC)

Kemal Bokhary replacement 
In 2012, Permanent Judge Kemal Bokhary - known as a leading liberal and dissenting voice on the Court - did not have his tenure extended past the mandated retirement age of 65. His replacement, however, was 65-year old Robert Tang, who was even older than Bokhary but was seen as more conservative.

China's National Security Law

Resignation of non-permanent judges 
No non-permanent judge from overseas jurisdictions had ever quit the Court mid-term before the enactment of the National Security Law. In September 2020, then-non-permanent judge James Spigelman resigned in response to China's controversial National Security Law being imposed on Hong Kong, but Spigelman did not elaborate further. In March 2022, both Lord Reed and Lord Hodge resigned as non-permanent judges, citing the National Security Law leading to the judges being unable to "continue to sit in Hong Kong without appearing to endorse an administration which has departed from values of political freedom, and freedom of expression, to which the Justices of the Supreme Court are deeply committed."

In November 2022, Lady Hale - who had refused to renew her tenure on the Court in 2020 - suggested that British judges should leave the CFA.

Counsel for national security defendants 
Within hours of the CFA allowing media tycoon Jimmy Lai to hire Tim Owen KC, chief executive John Lee announced that the Government would seek an interpretation under Article 158 to overturn the CFA's decision (as well as overturning the decisions by the Chief Judge and the Court of Appeal). This was roundly condemned by legal pundits, including Elsie Leung and Lord Pannick KC. Even before the interpretation, the Immigration Department withheld Owen's work visa, contrary to what the CFA had ruled. This decision was criticized by leading barrister Lord Pannick KC, who frequently represents the Hong Kong Government in court.

Maria Yuen nomination saga 
In June 2021, Justice Maria Yuen was recommended for appointment as a permanent judge by the Judicial Officers Recommendation Commission.  However the promotion was rejected by pro-Beijing legislators, in an unprecedented breach of the norms of an independent legal system. The legislators, who by protocol accept the recommendations of the commission, claimed that she might be influenced by her husband, former Chief Justice Geoffrey Ma, whose defence of Hong Kong's judicial independence they considered unpatriotic.

See also 

 Law of Hong Kong
 Judiciary of Hong Kong
Chief Justice of the Court of Final Appeal
Permanent Judges of the Court of Final Appeal
High Court (Hong Kong)
Chief Judge of the High Court of Hong Kong
Supreme Court (Hong Kong)

Notes

References

External links 

 Hong Kong Court of Final Appeal

 
Hong Kong
Government Hill
1997 establishments in Hong Kong
Courts and tribunals established in 1997